Kappus is a surname. Notable people with the surname include:

Franz Xaver Kappus (1883–1966), Austrian military officer, journalist, editor and writer
Jurij Ambrož Kappus, 18th-century politician in modern-day Slovenia
Mike Kappus (born 1950), American music manager and record producer